Mats Emil Assergård (born 23 May 1991 in Undrom, Sweden) is a singer-songwriter and musician that creates music in Swedish. He has been signed to Universal Music since 2016. Assergård currently resides in Stockholm.

Career 
Assergård has released three studio albums, with the first being Rakt från hjärtat, which was released in 2013. His second album was released in 2015, called Den Ensamma Känslan. His most recent album was released in 2019, which is called Leva Livet / En samling and it debuted and peaked at number five on the Swedish Album Chart and was subsequently certified Platinum in Sweden. The record marked his first album release while being signed to Universal Music. He has since 2013 released a handful of singles, including "All In" and "Ego", which have accumulated combined streams of over 45 million on Spotify. His song "Jag råkade sälja min bästa vän" was certified Gold in Sweden in late 2015. Some of Assergård's most recent singles were released on 10 April 2020, called "Om Jag Vore DJ" and "Om Jag Vore DJ V2." Assergård has also released three EPs during his career: Naket, which was released in 2013, Skön that was released in 2015 and Snö which also was released that year. Assergård was nominated for the "Male live performer of the year" Rockbjörnen award in 2019, but Benjamin Ingrosso later received the award. On 28 August 2020, Assergård released the single "Livet Suger".

He participated in Melodifestivalen 2021, but was eliminated in the semi-final.

Discography 
Adapted from Spotify.

Albums

Extended plays

Singles

Notes

References 

Swedish singer-songwriters
Living people
1991 births
Swedish-language singers
21st-century Swedish singers
21st-century Swedish male singers
People from Sollefteå Municipality
Melodifestivalen contestants of 2021